This is a list of early feature-length colour films (including primarily black-and-white films that have one or more color sequences) made up to about 1936, when the Technicolor three-strip process firmly established itself as the major-studio favorite. About a third of the films are thought to be lost films, with no prints surviving. Some have survived incompletely or only in black-and-white copies made for TV broadcast use in the 1950s.

Background
The earliest attempts to produce color films involved either tinting the film broadly with washes or baths of dyes, or pains-takingly hand-painting certain areas of each frame of the film with transparent dyes. Stencil-based techniques such as Pathéchrome were a labor-saving alternative if many copies of a film had to be colored: each dye was rolled over the whole print using an appropriate stencil to restrict the dye to selected areas of each frame. The Handschiegl color process was a comparable technique. Because transparent dyes did not impact the clarity or detail of the image seen on the screen, the result could look rather naturalistic, but the choice of what colors to use and where was made by a person, so they could be very arbitrary and unlike the actual colors.

Edward Raymond Turner's process, tested in 1902, was the first to capture full natural color on motion picture film, but it proved to be mechanically impractical. A simplified two-color version, introduced as Kinemacolor in 1908, was marginally successful for a few years, but the special projector it required and its inherent major technical defects contributed to its demise in 1914. Technicolor, originally also a two-color process capable of only a limited range of hues, was commercialized in 1922 and soon became the most widely used of the several two-color processes available in the 1920s.

Beginning in 1932, Technicolor introduced a new full-color process, "Process 4", now commonly called "three-strip Technicolor" because the special camera used for live-action filming yielded separate black-and-white negatives for each of the three primary colors. The final print, however, was a single full-color strip of film that did not need any special handling. This became the standard process used by the major Hollywood studios until the mid-1950s.

List of films

See also
 Color motion picture film
 List of color film systems
 List of film formats
 List of lost films 
 List of incomplete or partially lost films
 List of rediscovered films
 Multicolor
 Prizmacolor

References

External links
 Timeline of Historical Film Colors
 Color Cinematography of the Silent Era
 Early color features filmography (1917-1935) from Wayback Machine

Early color feature films
Articles containing video clips
 

it:Procedimenti di cinematografia a colori